Butorac is a surname. Notable people with the surname include:

Anka Butorac (1906–1942), Croatian communist
Dino Butorac (born 1990), Croatian basketballer
Eric Butorac (born 1981), former American tennis player
Milan Butorac (born 1952), Croatian rower
Paul Butorac (born 1983), American basketballer 

Croatian surnames